The payment card industry (PCI) denotes the debit, credit, prepaid, e-purse, ATM, and POS cards and associated businesses.

Overview 
The payment card industry consists of all the organizations which store, process and transmit cardholder data, most notably for debit cards and credit cards. The security standards are developed by the Payment Card Industry Security Standards Council which develops the Payment Card Industry Data Security Standards used throughout the industry. Individual card brands establish compliance requirements that are used by service providers and have their own compliance programs. Major card brands include American Express, Discover Financial Services, Japan Credit Bureau, Mastercard, RuPay, UnionPay and Visa. Most companies use member banks that connect and accept transactions from the card brands. Not all card brands use member banks, like American Express, these instead act as their own bank.

, the United States uses a magnetic stripe on a card to process transactions and its security relies on the holder's signature and visual inspection of the card to check for features such as hologram. This system will be outmoded and replaced by EMV in 2015. EMV is a global standard for inter-operation of integrated circuit cards (IC cards or "chip cards") and IC card capable point of sale (POS) terminals and automated teller machines (ATMs), for authenticating credit and debit card transactions. It has enhanced security features, but is still susceptible to fraud.

Payment Card Industry Security Standards Council 

On 7 September 2006, American Express, Discover Financial Services, Japan Credit Bureau, Mastercard and Visa International formed the Payment Card Industry Security Standards Council (PCI SSC) security council with the goal of managing the ongoing evolution of the Payment Card Industry Data Security Standard. The council itself claims to be independent of the various card vendors that make up the council. As of 1 August 2014, the PCI SSC website lists 688 "Participating Organizations". Internationally, 61 different financial institutions were noted, including Bank of America, Capital One, JPMorgan Chase, Royal Bank of Scotland, TD Bank and Wells Fargo. A total of 275 merchants were listed,  including Amazon, Burger King, Citgo, Dell, Equifax, ExxonMobil, Global Cash Access, Motorola, Microsoft, Southwest Airlines and Walmart.

Industry growth 
MasterCard's Nicole Krieg has noted that the Russian credit card market started in early 2000, when issuers first began launching products. However, credit products became especially popular in Russia in 2005, after new legislation took effect. Immense growth was noted in just eight years, by comparing second quarter growth on Visa card purchases, which went from $306 million in 2002 to $61.5 billion in 2010. Merchants who accepted Visa cards also increased from 21,000 to 331,000 during the same period. Visa also noted that they had issued 70 million cards and the Central Bank of the Russian Federation reported that 8.6 million credit cards were on issue.

Regional and national payment schemes

Interac Association 

The Interac Association is Canada's national organization linking Financial Institutions and enterprises that have proprietary networks, to enable communication with each other for the purpose of exchanging electronic financial transactions. The Association was founded in 1984 by the big five banks. Today, there are over 80 members. The Interac Association is the organization responsible for the development of Canada's national network of two shared electronic financial services: Shared Cash Dispensing (SCD) for cash withdrawals from any ABM not belonging to a cardholder's financial institution; and Interac Direct Payment (IDP) for Debit Card payments at the Point-of-Sale

See also 

 Payment Card Industry Data Security Standard
 Payment gateway
 Payment system
 Payment processor
 Payment service provider
 RuPay

References

External links

Payment card industry 
 PCI Security Standards Council, the organization responsible for the development, enhancement, storage, dissemination and implementation of security standards for account data protection.
 The European Payment Council (EPC) is the decision-making and coordination body of the European banking industry in relation to payments.
 PCI Security Standards Council Participating Organizations

EMV 
 EMVCo, the organization responsible for developing and maintaining the EMV standard
 Chip and PIN, site run by the UK Payments Administration (UKPA), the UK's central co-ordinating authority for the implementation of EMV

Payment cards
Information privacy
Financial services